Stein of Sweden - Swedish: Sten - may refer to:

Sten Sture the Elder, Regent of Sweden 1470
Sten Sture the Younger, Regent of Sweden 1512
Stein, Prince of Sweden 1546, son of King Gustav I (died in infancy)